Mafia Mamma is an upcoming American action comedy film directed by Catherine Hardwicke, from a screenplay by Michael J. Feldman and Debbie Jhoon, and based on an original story by Amanda Sthers. It stars Toni Collette and Monica Bellucci.

Pre-production began in 2021 with filming taking place in Rome in May 2022.  The film is scheduled to be released in theaters on April 14, 2023.

Premise
Middle-aged writer Kristin is dealing with her son leaving for college, her sexist boss, and her recently discovered unfaithful husband. During this difficult time, Bianca, her estranged grandfather's trusted advisor, contacts her with news that he has passed away and she must attend his funeral in Italy. Despite initial hesitation, Kristin is convinced by her friend Jenny, who is an outspoken lawyer, that this trip could be just what she needs to start healing herself. However, things take a turn for the worse when the funeral transforms into a violent gunfight, and Kristin discovers that her grandfather wished for her, his last living descendant, to assume the role of boss for the most powerful Mafia family in Calabria.

Cast
 Toni Collette as Kristin
 Monica Bellucci as Bianca 
 Rob Huebel
 Sophia Nomvete
 Giulio Corso
 Francesco Mastroianni
 Alfonso Perugini
 Eduardo Scarpetta
 Tim Daish
 Tommy Rodger

Production
Mafia Mamma was reported to be in pre-production in October 2021, with Catherine Hardwicke on board as director. Michael J. Feldman and Debbie Jhoon wrote the screenplay, based on an original story by Amanda Sthers.  Toni Collette, Monica Bellucci and Rob Huebel joined the cast in leading roles.   

Principal photography took place in May 2022 on location in Rome, Italy.

Release
Mafia Mamma is scheduled to be released theatrically on April 14, 2023, by Bleecker Street.

References

External links
 
  
 
 
 

2020s American films
2020s English-language films
American action comedy films
Films set in Rome
Films shot in Rome
Mafia films
Bleecker Street films
Films directed by Catherine Hardwicke
Films scored by Alex Heffes